Talmei Eliyahu (lit. Eliyahu Furrows) is a moshav in southern Israel. Located in the Hevel Eshkol area of the north-western Negev desert, it falls under the jurisdiction of Eshkol Regional Council.

History
The moshav was founded in 1970 by immigrants from France and was named after Eliyahu Krauze, a former head of the Mikveh Israel agricultural school. It was founded as a collective moshav and became a workers' moshav in 1974.

References

French-Jewish culture in Israel
Moshavim
Populated places established in 1970
Gaza envelope
Populated places in Southern District (Israel)
1970 establishments in Israel